Terence John Humes (October 1944 – 7 September 2017), known professionally as Terence Harvey, was a British television actor. Among his many roles was the prosecution counsel in The Execution of Gary Glitter. He also appeared in From Hell, Johnny English, Hollyoaks, The White Countess,  Mr. Selfridge, Hustle, Downton Abbey, and The Damned United.

Filmography

References

External links

Terence Harvey at the British Film Institute
Terence Harvey (Aveleyman)

1944 births
2017 deaths
Place of birth missing
Place of death missing
British male television actors
20th-century British male actors
21st-century British male actors